U.S. of Ant is a gay-and travel-themed series aired by Logo. Hosted by actor and comedian Ant, the series follows him as he travels to small-town American destinations, speaking with gay, bisexual and straight residents of various communities to learn about the spirit and aspects of LGBT life away from a metropolitan setting. The series premiered in summer 2006.

In its first season, Ant traveled to such diverse locales as Montana, Mississippi, North Carolina, Alabama, New Hampshire, Texas and Florida.

Full episodes of U.S. of Ant may be viewed for free at its official Logo website. The series is also available for download from the iTunes Store.

References

External links
 

2006 American television series debuts
2006 American television series endings
2000s American LGBT-related television series
Logo TV original programming
2000s LGBT-related reality television series